Mount Sinai Beth Israel is a 799-bed teaching hospital in Manhattan. It is part of the Mount Sinai Health System, a nonprofit health system formed in September 2013 by the merger of Continuum Health Partners and Mount Sinai Medical Center, and an academic affiliate of the Icahn School of Medicine at Mount Sinai.

History
Beth Israel is Hebrew for "House of Israel." The hospital was incorporated as Beth Israel Hospital on May 28, 1890, by a group of 40 Orthodox Jews on the Lower East Side of Manhattan, each of whom paid 25 cents to set up a hospital dedicated to serving immigrant Jews living in the tenement slums of the Lower East Side of Manhattan.  At the time, most of New York's hospitals would not treat Jewish patients.  It initially opened a dispensary at 206 Broadway in 1891, and moved to Jefferson and Cherry Streets in 1895. On March 12, 1929, it moved to First Avenue and 16th Street, facing Stuyvesant Square, and the old building was converted into an old age home, the Home of Old Israel. It purchased its neighbor Manhattan General Hospital in 1964 and was renamed Beth Israel Medical Center on March 10, 1965.

By then it had extended beyond its Jewish base and served the entire population of Lower Manhattan including Manhattan's Lower East Side, Chinatown, Gramercy, the West Village, and Chelsea. In 1988 it had the largest network of heroin-treatment clinics in the United States with 7,500 patients and 23 facilities. It acquired Doctors Hospital on the Upper East Side in the 1990s, renaming it Beth Israel Medical Center-Singer Division, and Kings Highway Hospital Center in Brooklyn in 1995, renaming it Beth Israel Medical Center-Kings Highway Division. In 2004, the Singer Division closed and the Manhattan inpatient operations were consolidated in the buildings on First Avenue at 16th Street in Manhattan.

As of 2010 Mount Sinai Beth Israel had residency training programs in nearly every major field of medicine including Emergency Medicine, Internal Medicine, Surgery, Otolaryngology, Oral and maxillofacial surgery, Radiology, Family Medicine, Dermatology, Obstetrics and Gynecology, Neurology, Ophthalmology, Pathology, Psychiatry, Podiatry, and Urology.  Mount Sinai Beth Israel also has a department of Chiropractic, Music Therapy, and Acupuncture.

On November 22, 2013, the name of Beth Israel Medical Center was changed to Mount Sinai Beth Israel as a part of the merger with Mount Sinai to form the Mount Sinai Health System.

On May 25, 2016, Mount Sinai announced a significant restructuring and downsizing, with plans to build a new hospital with only 70 inpatient beds on a site several blocks away, after which the main hospital on 16th Street would close and be sold.

On June 11, 2017, the hospital's Labor and Delivery Department closed, followed by the hospital's "Continuum Center for Health and Healing" later in the year.

The relocation plan, which would have the new facility open in 2023 and share a campus with the New York Eye and Ear Infirmary was approved by the state on February 6, 2020, however on June 15, 2021, the hospital announced they would no longer be relocating.

References

External links

 Official website
 Phillips School of Nursing

Continuum Health Partners
Gramercy Park
Hospital buildings completed in 1902
Hospital buildings completed in 1929
Hospitals established in 1890
Hospitals in Manhattan
Teaching hospitals in New York City